Ein Gedi (lit. Kid Spring) is a kibbutz on the western shore of the Dead Sea in Israel. Located on the edge of the Judean desert at the site of historic Ein Gedi, it falls under the jurisdiction of Tamar Regional Council.

History
The kibbutz was founded in 1953. It was named after the Biblical Ein Gedi, located on Tel Goren (Arabic: Tell el-Jurn) beside the kibbutz. Located on the edge of the Green Line separating Israel from the Jordanian-held West Bank, the kibbutz was completely isolated in the desert, the nearest Israeli village being several hours away via a dirt road. After the 1967 Six-Day War and Israel's capture of the West Bank from Jordan, a road was paved from Jerusalem via Jericho and along the shore of the Dead Sea. This essentially ended the kibbutz's isolation and opened the door to its development.

Economy

Ein Gedi is primarily involved with agriculture and tourism of the surrounding area and neighboring antiquities. In 1997, the kibbutz opened a facility to bottle the water of the Ein Gedi spring. The product is known as Ein Gedi Mineral Water. This led to controversy regarding the reselling of a public resource.

Botanical garden
The kibbutz operates a 100 dunam (10 ha, 24.7 acre) botanical garden housing over 900 plant species from around the world. It is the only populated botanical garden in the world, with 500 residents. The garden joined the register of the Botanic Gardens Conservation International in 1994. The garden includes date palms and Arecaceae, tropical and desert flora.

Climate
Ein Gedi has a hot desert climate (Köppen climate classification: BWh).

Gallery

References

External links

Official website (Hebrew)
Ein Gedi Botanical Garden website

Kibbutzim
Kibbutz Movement
Tamar Regional Council
Populated places established in 1953
Nahal settlements
Populated places in Southern District (Israel)
1953 establishments in Israel